The Italian Baseball League 2nd Division is a professional baseball league in Italy affiliated with the Italian Baseball League 1D.  The league used the franchise system, rather than the European-model promotion and relegation

Teams
Knights Verona (De Angelis Godo)
Senago Milano Baseball United (Novara United)
Montepaschi Grosseto (Montepaschi Grosseto)
Fortitudo Castenaso (Fortitudo Bologna)
Macerata Angels (T&A San Marino Baseball)
Junior Parma (Caraparma Parma)
Danesi Nettuno 2 (Danesi Nettuno B.C.)
Riccione (Telemarket Rimini)

Baseball competitions in Italy
Baseball leagues in Europe